The Communications Exploitation Section (CXS), established in December 2002, is an office of the Operations II branch of the FBI Counterterrorism Division, which is tasked with analyzing captured communications data (such as phone call records and internet traffic) to identify and monitor "terrorist" networks.

From 2003 to 2005, CXS sent out 739 "exigent letters" to U.S. telephone companies requesting that they send phone call records for their customers.

See also
 Communications Assistance For Law Enforcement Act
 Surveillance
 War on Terrorism

References

Further reading
 A Review of the Federal Bureau of Investigation's Use of Exigent Letters and Other Informal Requests for Telephone Records, U.S. Department of Justice, Office of the Inspector General, Oversight and Review Division, January 2010 (Accessed: August 14, 2010)
 Robert Mueller, The FBI's Counterterrorism Program: Report to The National Commission on Terrorist Attacks upon the United States
 Bassem Youssef Letter to Director Mueller
 

Surveillance
Federal Bureau of Investigation